Max Julen (born 15 March 1961) is a Swiss former alpine skier, 1984 Olympic champion in giant slalom.

References

External links

1961 births
Living people
Alpine skiers at the 1984 Winter Olympics
Swiss male alpine skiers
Olympic medalists in alpine skiing
People from Zermatt
Medalists at the 1984 Winter Olympics
Olympic alpine skiers of Switzerland
Olympic gold medalists for Switzerland
Sportspeople from Valais
20th-century Swiss people